Gennady Ordenov (Russian: Геннадий Иванович Орденов; born 4 September 1957) is a Russian politician serving as a senator from the Legislative Assembly of Astrakhan Oblast since 23 September 2021.

Gennady Ordenov is under personal sanctions introduced by the European Union, the United Kingdom, the USA, Canada, Switzerland, Australia, Ukraine, New Zealand, for ratifying the decisions of the "Treaty of Friendship, Cooperation and Mutual Assistance between the Russian Federation and the Donetsk People's Republic and between the Russian Federation and the Luhansk People's Republic" and providing political and economic support for Russia's annexation of Ukrainian territories.

Biography

Gennady Ordenov was born on 4 September 1957 in Kobda District, Aktobe Region. In 1984, he graduated from the Gubkin Russian State University of Oil and Gas. From 1976, he worked as a geophysicist. From 1984 to 1996, he was the head of several geological expeditions. From 1996 to 2003, Ordenov became the head of the municipal formation "Working Village Ilyinka". From 2003 to 2005, he was the deputy head of the Arkhangelsk Oblast administration. In 2008, he was appointed Deputy General Director for General Affairs of the Lukoil branch Nizhnevolzhskneft. On 14 March 2010, Ordenov became deputy of the Astrakhan City Duma of the 5th convocation. On 4 December 2011, he was elected deputy of the Duma of Astrakhan Oblast of the 5th convocation. On 23 September 2021 he became the senator from the Legislative Assembly of Astrakhan Oblast.

References

Living people
1957 births
United Russia politicians
21st-century Russian politicians
People from Kobda District
Members of the Federation Council of Russia (after 2000)